The Los Angeles Wildcats (LA Wildcats) were a professional American football team based in the Los Angeles metropolitan area. The team was founded by Vince McMahon’s Alpha Entertainment and was an owned-and-operated member of the new XFL. The Wildcats played their home games at Dignity Health Sports Park. On March 8, 2020, the Wildcats played their final game against the Tampa Bay Vipers, which was the final XFL game before the league suspended operations due to the COVID-19 pandemic.

History
On December 5, 2018, Los Angeles. was announced as one of eight cities that would join the newly reformed XFL, as well as Seattle, Houston, Los Angeles, New York, St. Louis, Tampa Bay, and Dallas. On May 7, 2019, Winston Moss was announced as the team's head coach. On August 21, 2019, the team revealed its name, logos, and identity as the Los Angeles Wildcats, alongside the rest of the XFL teams. A secondary logo was released August 24.

On October 15, 2019, The BattleHawks announced their first player in team history, being assigned former Birmingham Iron Quarterback Luis Perez, who was later traded to the New York Guardians.

On February 8, 2020, the team played its first game losing to the Houston Roughnecks 37–17 in Houston. Chad Kanoff scored the first touchdown in franchise history with a scramble left for a five yard score. On February 23, 2020, the Wildcats earned their first win in franchise history, defeating the DC Defenders 39–9. On March 8, 2020, the Wildcats came from behind to win against the Tampa Bay Vipers 41-34 in what was the final game of the 2020 iteration of the XFL. On March 12, 2020, The XFL announced that the remainder of the 2020 XFL season had been cancelled due to the COVID-19 pandemic. The team finished with a 2-3 record. On April 10, 2020, The XFL Suspended operations, with all employees, players, and staff terminated.

On July 24, 2022, the XFL confirmed that the Wildcats would not return for the 2023 XFL season. On October 31, 2022, the league announced that the Wildcats' place in the league was taken by the San Antonio Brahmas.

Market overview
Los Angeles is one of two cities to have also hosted a team in the original XFL, the other being New York/New Jersey; the Los Angeles Xtreme was the champion of the earlier XFL in the league's only season. (A third broader megalopolis, Central Florida, has also hosted teams in both the 2001 and 2020 incarnations of the league.)

As television networks have traditionally required alternative leagues to field teams in New York and Los Angeles to secure television coverage without brokering the airtime, Southern California has a long history of alternative professional teams. In addition to the Xtreme, the city has hosted: the Los Angeles Avengers, LA KISS, Anaheim Piranhas and Los Angeles Cobras in the Arena Football League; the Los Angeles Express in the USFL; the Southern California Sun in the World Football League; the Orange County Ramblers and short-lived Long Beach Admirals in the Continental Football League; and numerous teams in the Pacific Coast Professional Football League in the 1930s and 1940s.

The Wildcats were in one of the most heavily crowded sports markets in the United States, competing for sports dollars against two NFL teams (Los Angeles Rams and Los Angeles Chargers), two NHL teams (Los Angeles Kings and Anaheim Ducks), two NBA teams (Los Angeles Lakers and Los Angeles Clippers), multiple NCAA Division I college basketball and college football programs, and in March and April, both the LA Galaxy and Los Angeles FC in MLS and the Los Angeles Dodgers and Los Angeles Angels in the MLB.

Staff

Roster

Player and staff history

Head coach history

Offensive coordinator history

Defensive coordinator history

Notable former players 
 Josh Johnson – current San Francisco 49ers quarterback, 2008 5th-round pick
 Storm Norton – current Los Angeles Chargers offensive lineman
 Nick Novak – former 12-year NFL veteran
 Shawn Oakman – two-time CFL All-Star

References

External links